The 2007 KNVB Cup Final was a football match between AZ and Ajax on 6 May 2007 at De Kuip, Rotterdam. It was the final match of the 2006–07 KNVB Cup competition. Ajax beat AZ on penalties after the match finished 1–1 after extra time. It was Ajax' 17th KNVB Cup title.

Route to the final

Match

Details

References

2007
2006–07 in Dutch football
AZ Alkmaar matches
AFC Ajax matches
May 2007 sports events in Europe
KNVB Cup Final 2007